The following is an overview of the year 2009 in Japanese music. It includes notable awards, lists of number-ones, yearly best-sellers, albums released, groups established and disestablished, deaths of notable Japanese music-related people as well as any other relevant Japanese music-related events. For overviews of the year in music from other countries, see 2009 in music.

Events
December 31 – 60th NHK Kōhaku Uta Gassen

Awards
May 30 – 2009 MTV Video Music Awards Japan
December 30 – 51st Japan Record Awards

Number-ones
Oricon number-one albums
Oricon number-one singles
Hot 100 number-one singles
RIAJ Digital Track Chart number-one singles

Best-sellers

Artists

Albums
The following is a list of the top 10 best-selling albums in Japan in 2009, according to Oricon. The best-selling album of the year, All the Best! 1999–2009, sold more than 1.43 million copies.

Albums released
The following section includes albums by Japanese artists released in Japan in 2009 as well as Japanese-language albums by foreign artists released in the country during this year.
January 14 – Camouflage by Merzbow
January 21 - Shin-shiro by Sakanaction
January 28 – 4 Akogare My Star by Cute
January 28 – 5 by Flow
February 4 – Antenna by GO!GO!7188
March 4 – Kyūtai by MUCC
March 9 – Remio Best by Remioromen
March 17 – Hayley Sings Japanese Songs 2 by Hayley Westenra
March 18 – Akiko Infinity Kokia: Balance by Kokia
March 18 – Harmonia by Akiko Shikata
March 18 – Kokia Infinity Akiko: Balance by Kokia
March 21 – Do You Dreams Come True? by Dreams Come True
March 25 – Next Level by Ayumi Hamasaki 
May 27 – Dream by Yuna Ito
May 27 – Family by May J.
June 10 – Shio, Koshō by Greeeen
June 24 – Hocus Pocus by Kaela Kimura
July 15 – Fight by Mayumi Iizuka
August 5 – Calling by Kobukuro
August 19 – All the Best! 1999–2009 by Arashi
September 2 – Box Emotions by Superfly
September  9 -Emotions by Thelma Aoyama 
September 16 - Best Ai by Ai 
September 23 – Ayaka's History 2006–2009 by Ayaka
October 21 – Best Scandal by Scandal
November 25 – Aurora by Nico Touches the Walls
December 2 – Aisubeki Mirai e by Exile
December 9 – Carol by Chara
December 9 – I Am by Mao Denda
December 16 – Past<Future by Namie Amuro 
December 23 – Anime's Compilation Best by Kotoko
December 23 – Hajimari no Uta by Ikimono-gakari
13 Japanese Birds by Merzbow

Groups established
Angerme
bump.y
ClariS
Flower
Gacharic Spin
Oldcodex
Passepied
Passpo
SDN48
Shiritsu Ebisu Chugaku
Sphere
YuiKaori

Groups disestablished
BeForU
Bleach
GAM
Kuroyume
Two-Mix

Deaths
Jasmine You dies on August 9.

See also
 2009 in Japan
 2009 in Japanese television
 List of Japanese films of 2009

References